The 1982 Dwars door België was the 37th edition of the Dwars door Vlaanderen cycle race and was held on 28 March 1982. The race started and finished in Waregem. The race was won by Jan Raas.

General classification

References

1982
1982 in road cycling
1982 in Belgian sport
March 1982 sports events in Europe